Xuriella is a small genus of spiders in the jumping spider family, Salticidae.

The female of Heliophanus pygmaeus was incorrectly associated with the male of X. prima. Both species are beetle-like in appearance. Beetle mimicry is rather common in spiders (including salticids), and has probably developed independently several times.

Species
 Xuriella marmorea Wesolowska & van Harten, 2007 — Yemen
 Xuriella prima Wesolowska & Russell-Smith, 2000 — Tanzania

Notes

References
  (2004): A redescription of Heliophanus pygmaeus Wesolowska et Russel-Smith, 2000, a small beetle-like salticid from Africa (Araneae: Salticidae). Genus 15(2): 275-280. PDF
  (2009): The world spider catalog, version 9.5. American Museum of Natural History.

External links
 Salticidae.org: Photographs of X. marmorea
 Salticidae.org: Diagnostic drawings of X. prima

Salticidae genera
Spiders of Africa
Spiders of Asia
Taxa named by Wanda Wesołowska
Salticidae